The International Besançon Competition for Young Conductors, is a music competition for young conductors in the city of Besançon, France.

History
The competition was organized for the first time in 1951 by the music and film critic and composer Émile Vuillermoz, as part of the Besançon International Music Festival, founded three years before. Many conductors who won the competition have established successful international careers, including Seiji Ozawa, Ali Rahbari, Jesús López-Cobos and Sylvain Cambreling.

The first prize consists of a cash prize and engagements with important orchestras such as the BBC Symphony Orchestra, Ensemble orchestral contemporain, Dresden Philharmonic and Opera North Sinfonia.

Winners
The winners of the competition are:

 1951  Reinhard Peters 
 1952  Jean Périsson 
 1953  Peter Traunfellner
 1954  Peter Chaille 
 1955  Jerzy Katlewicz
 1956  Zdeněk Košler, first mention Sergiu Comissiona
 1957  Jean Lapierre 
 1958  Martin Turnovsky
 1959  Seiji Ozawa
 1960  Poul Jorgensen 
 1961  Pierre Hetu  
 1962  Vladimir Kojoukharov 
 1963  Aloïs Springer  
 1964  Emil Simon 
 1965  Zdeněk Mácal 
 1966  no first prize awarded 
 1967  Yuval Zaliouk, junior section Luis Antonio García Navarro
 1968  Jesús López-Cobos and Philippe Bender 
 1969  no first prize awarded
 1970  Stéphane Cardon 
 1971  no first prize awarded
 1972  Jacques Mercier (conductor) 
 1973  no first prize awarded 
 1974  Alex Veelo, 2nd prize Sylvain Cambreling 
 1975  Marc Soustrot 
 1976  Patrick Juzeau 
 1977  Tomas Koutnik and Ali Rahbari 
 1978  Yoel Levi 
 1979  Doron Salomon 
 1980  Jonathan Seers 
 1981  Philippe Cambreling
 1982  Yôko Matsuo and Osmo Vänskä
 1983  Michael Zilm, mention for Carlo Rizzi 
 1984  Wolfgang Doerner 
 1985  Wing-Sie Yip, 2nd prize Rodolfo Saglimbeni.
 1986  Gilles Auger 
 1987  Nicolás Pasquet
 1988  Lü Shao-chia
 1989  Christopher Gayford and Yutaka Sado
 1990  Ryusuke Numajiri 
 1991  George Pehlivanian 
 1992  Tommaso Placidi 
 1993  Silvia Massarelli and Daisuke Soga 
 1995  Tetsuro Ban 
 1994  Lü Shao-chia
 1997  Marco Parisotto 
 1999  Alvaro Albiach-Fernandez 
 2001  Tatsuya Shimono 
 2003  no first prize awarded
 2005  Lionel Bringuier
 2007  Darrell Ang
 2009  Kazuki Yamada
 2011  Yuki Kakiuchi
 2013  Yao-Yu Wu
 2015 Jonathon Heyward
 2017 Ben Glassberg
 2019 Nodoka Okisawa

References

External links 
 International Besançon Competition for Young Conductors — Official website

Conducting competitions
Besançon International Music Festival